Kosmos 300 ( meaning Cosmos 300) (Ye-8-5 series) was the fourth Soviet attempt at an unmanned lunar sample return. It was probably similar in design to the later Luna 16 spacecraft. It was launched, on a Proton rocket, on September 23, 1969. The mission was a failure. The engines on the Block D upper stage failed due to an oxidizer leak, leaving the spacecraft to burn up in Earth's atmosphere.

References 

Luna programme
Kosmos satellites
Sample return missions
Missions to the Moon
Spacecraft launched in 1969